Shin Ji-ho (born 23 June 1963) is a South Korean politician. He was noted for being a temporary spokesperson of Na Kyung-won for the October 2011 by-election. He is one of the prominent members of the New Right movement.

Controversy
He made a disrespectful comment towards the protesters in the Yongsan Incident calling them "criminals" and supported police brutality against them.
He was shown drunken for a live debate show on MBC on 7 October 2011 about issues on the October 2011 by-election; later resigned as a spokesperson of the candidate, Na Kyung-won, on the next day.

References

External links
  Official Website
  Profile on Naver

1963 births
Kyunggi High School alumni
People from Seoul
Yonsei University alumni
Living people